Jeff Martin Spek (born October 1, 1960) is a former American football tight end in the National Football League (NFL) for the Tampa Bay Buccaneers. He also was a member of the New Jersey Generals in the United States Football League (USFL). He played college football at the University of Nevada, Las Vegas.

Early years
Spek was born in Calgary, Alberta, Canada, and played football at El Modena High School in Orange, California. He went on to attend the University of Nevada, Las Vegas. In 1981 as a junior, he registered 54 receptions for 895 yards, 13th in nation in total yards. After the season, a coaching change made him take the decision to transfer to San Diego State University, along with Jim Sandusky. He was a starter in his senior season.

Professional career

New Jersey Generals (USFL)
Spek was selected by the New Jersey Generals in the 15th round (303rd overall) of the 1984 USFL Draft. He became a starter at tight end as a rookie and registered 49 receptions (team leader), 732 receiving yards (led the team) and 5 receiving touchdowns (led the team). His stats dropped the next year with rookie Doug Flutie as the new starter at quarterback (Brian Sipe was the previous starter).

Dallas Cowboys
He was selected by the Dallas Cowboys in the third round (81st overall) of the 1984 NFL Supplemental Draft of USFL and CFL Players. He signed a contract on August 12, 1986, to start playing in the NFL after the USFL folded. He was waived on August 26.

Tampa Bay Buccaneers
On October 25, 1986, Spek was signed by the Tampa Bay Buccaneers as a free agent. He played as a backup, after his professional career ended with a blown knee, suffered while playing special teams against the Buffalo Bills. He was later placed on the injured reserve list.

References

External links
A General Dreams of Being a Cowboys

1960 births
Living people
Sportspeople from Calgary
Sportspeople from Orange, California
Players of American football from California
Canadian players of American football
American football tight ends
UNLV Rebels football players
San Diego State Aztecs football players
Tampa Bay Buccaneers players
New Jersey Generals players